Osadcheye is a rural locality (a selo) in Alexeyevsky District, Belgorod Oblast, Russia. The population was 234 as of 2010. There are 3 streets.

Geography 
Osadcheye is located 39 km south of Alexeyevka (the district's administrative centre) by road. Kalitva is the nearest rural locality.

References 

Rural localities in Alexeyevsky District, Belgorod Oblast
Biryuchensky Uyezd